The Sierra del Fraile (Spanish for "Friar's range"), also known as "Cerro del Fraile", is a mountain and a protected area located in the García, Abasolo, Hidalgo, General Escobedo, El Carmen y Mina municipalities in the state of Nuevo León, México. The mountain is part of Sierra Madre Oriental; its summit elevation is 2,392 MASL, and its prominence is 1,592 meters (Line parent: Cerro de la Viga). It is an ultraprominent peak, with a topographic isolation of about 23.5 km (Nearest highest neighbor: Sierra de San Urbano).

See also 

 Cerro Potosí
 Cerro de Chipinque
 Cerro de las Mitras
 Cerro del Topo Chico
 List of Ultras of Mexico

References 

Mountains of Mexico
Sierra Madre Oriental
Pages with unreviewed translations